Belcher's gull (Larus belcheri), also known as the band-tailed gull, is a bird in the family Laridae found along the Pacific coast of South America. It formerly included the very similar Olrog's gull as a subspecies, but that bird occurs on the Atlantic coast of South America and is now accepted as Larus atlanticus. Belcher's gull is a medium-sized gull with a blackish mantle, white head and underparts, a black band on the otherwise white tail, and a yellow bill with a red and black tip. Non-breeding adults have a brownish-black head and a white eye-ring. The name of this bird commemorates the British explorer Sir Edward Belcher who performed survey work on the Pacific coast of South America.

Description

The sexes are similar in appearance and in the breeding season, the adult has a white head and very pale grey neck and underparts. The mantle and back are greyish-black and the tail is white with a broad black subterminal band and a white trailing edge. The wing coverts and primaries are black and the secondaries dark grey with white tips. The eye is black, the bill yellow with a distinctive red and black tip, and the legs and feet yellow. Outside the breeding season the head is dark brown with a white ring surrounding the eye. The juvenile is mottled brown and white and attains the adult plumage during its third year. Belcher's gull can be confused with the slightly larger kelp gull (Larus dominicanus) but that species has a small white tip on its otherwise black wing and lacks the Belcher's gull's black band on its tail.

Distribution and habitat
Belcher's gull is found on the Pacific coast of South America. Its range extends from northern Peru to northern Chile in the area influenced by the Humboldt Current and its habitat includes rocky shores, bays and offshore islands. It ventures several kilometres offshore to forage and also feeds on rocky shores when the tide is out. It is a non-migratory species.

Ecology

Belcher's gull is an omnivore and scavenger. It feeds on fish, crabs, molluscs and carrion, and seasonally on the eggs and nestlings of seabirds. It often associates with Guanay cormorants, pestering them until they regurgitate their prey which it then consumes.

Breeding takes place from December onwards in small colonies of up to one hundred pairs. The nest is a scrape in the sand or among rocks near the high tide line. There are usually three eggs averaging , pale blotched with dark olive markings.

Status
Persecution of this bird by humans has diminished and its population is thought to be increasing. For these reasons, despite its small total population size and limited range, the International Union for Conservation of Nature considers it to be of "least concern".

References

Belcher's gull
Birds of Chile
Birds of Ecuador
Birds of Peru
Western South American coastal birds
Belcher's gull